The East Room is an event and reception room in the Executive Residence, which is a building of the White House complex, the home of the president of the United States. The East Room is the largest room in the Executive Residence; it is used for dances, receptions, press conferences, ceremonies, concerts, and banquets. The East Room was one of the last rooms to be finished and decorated, and it has undergone substantial redecoration over the past two centuries. Since 1964, the Committee for the Preservation of the White House has, by executive order, advised the president of the United States and first lady on the decor, preservation, and conservation of the East Room and other public rooms at the White House.

Construction and early decoration
The White House was designed by architect James Hoban. Leinster House in Ireland was the main inspiration for the White House, and includes a large east room which may have inspired Hoban's East Room. But the newly added Large Dining Room at Mount Vernon may also have been a source for the design of the East Room. As his drawings of the second and third floor do not exist, it is unclear what use Hoban intended for the room. It is possible that Hoban intended it for use as a private gallery for the family. The middle window in the north wall was designed to provide access to a terrace (never built).

The East Room was first assigned a purpose in 1807. Architect Benjamin Henry Latrobe had been brought to the capital by Thomas Jefferson, who made him commissioner of public buildings. Latrobe surveyed the White House in 1803, and architectural drawings of the building (produced in 1807) are the earliest extant plans now known. On his sketches, Latrobe comments "Public Audience chamber entirely unfinished, the ceiling has given way." Latrobe also proposed sealing the windows on the east side of the room based on an architectural theory about natural light. But this change was not made.

Early furnishings
The East Room was among the last rooms on the State Floor to be completed and used. The White House was unfinished when President John Adams occupied it between 1800 and 1801. His wife, Abigail Adams, hung laundry in the bare East Room to dry. Although much of the White House was finished and decorated during Adams administration, the East Room was not. The room's lone artwork was a copy of the Lansdowne portrait depicting George Washington, painted by Gilbert Stuart in 1797. It was purchased by the White House in 1800, and hung in the East Room. (Rescued from the 1814 fire, it still hangs there, with a companion portrait of Martha Washington painted by Eliphalet Frazer Andrews in 1878.) There was extensive feeling in Congress that Adams had adopted too many of the trappings of monarchy, and Congress declined to appropriate funds to finish the room for fear it would look too much like a throne room. During the Jefferson administration, 38 gold-and-black painted chairs were purchased and placed in the room, but little else is known of the room's furnishings prior to 1814. Jefferson also had the East Room partitioned (using canvas and sailcloth for walls) and the southern end used for a bedroom and office for Meriwether Lewis and Lewis Harvie (both Private Secretary to the President).

Jefferson's successor, James Madison, sought to make the partitions permanent and asked Latrobe to design bedrooms and office space across the southern part of the room. But these changes were not made, either. Madison did use a portion of the East Room, however, for Cabinet meetings.

Post-fire restoration and furnishings
The East Room, along with the rest of the White House, was burned in 1814 during the Burning of Washington in the War of 1812. The interior was gutted, and most of the exterior sandstone walls remained standing. The north facade of the White House was the most damaged. But because the East Room had so little furniture in it, the section of the north facade fronting the East Room was the least damaged. Latrobe helped to reconstruct the White House.  In 1814 and 1815, the rebuilt East Room received new door frames and inlaid mahogany doors that remain in the room today. New plaster work in the form of a gilded cornice-line frieze of anthemion (a flowerlike, traditional Greek decorative pattern) was installed, and the walls plastered (and left unpainted) as well.

Federal style furniture, made by Georgetown craftsman William King Jr., was added to the East Room by President James Monroe in 1818. (First Lady Elizabeth Monroe's involvement was limited to choosing drapery fabric for the room). King produced 24 armchairs and four sofas, all made of mahogany. The total cost was $1,408. The furniture was not upholstered, and sat along the walls largely unused. In 1829, the first year of the Jackson administration, the King furniture was finally upholstered in blue damask silk. Monroe also purchased (for $80) a marble bust of George Washington by the Italian sculptor Giuseppe Ceracchi, which remained in the East Room probably until the Kennedy redecoration in 1962 (when it was moved to the Blue Room). Monroe also purchased in 1817 for the fireplace mantels four gilt bronze candelabra, designed and manufactured by the French bronzemaker Pierre-Philippe Thomire.

By 1825, the room contained 24 unfinished mahogany armchairs, four large unfinished mahogany sofas, eight tables made of pine, a door screen, a paper partition, a three-shelf bookshelf, a mahogany map stand, a washstand (with basin and ewer), and a clothes press. But for the most part, from 1818 to 1829 the East Room was unused. Occasionally it was cleared and used for dances, but usually its doors were locked and it served as storage space. A widely reported story claims that for two months in the summer of 1825, the East Room housed at least one live alligator that belonged to the visiting Marquis de Lafayette, but a lack of contemporary evidence suggests that the story might be apocryphal. Congress appropriated $6,000 to finally finish the room in 1826, although the funds were not made available until 1825. President John Quincy Adams used the money to repair the White House rather than finish the room.

1829 completion under Jackson
The East Room was finally completed and decorated in 1829 by Andrew Jackson. New plaster work in the form of a cornice-line frieze of anthemion (a flowerlike, traditional Greek decorative pattern) was installed, three Neoclassical plasterwork medallions affixed to the ceiling, and the demi-lune over the east wall's Venetian window removed and turned into a wall. Decorative wooden beams were added to the ceiling, and two of the east-facing windows were blocked off and fireplaces with black Italian marble mantelpieces installed in their place. The Jackson administration turned to French-born American importer Louis Véron of Philadelphia for assistance in furnishing the executive mansion. Véron was one of the first merchants to display items from a wide range of suppliers in a showroom, rather than manufacture the items himself. Nearly all the 1829 furnishings for the East Room were supplied by Véron. Véron also added gilt rays and stars over the west door (the one the president usually used when entering the room).

The bare walls were covered with yellow wallpaper with cloth edging, light-blue moreen drapes were added to the windows, and plaster cornices adorned with eagles were installed over the windows. Véron covered the floor with a red-bordered blue, fawn, and yellow  carpet woven in Brussels. The 1818 Monroe furniture was upholstered, three large mahogany tables topped with marble, and four white marble-topped pier tables placed in the room. For lighting, Véron provided several astral and mantel lamps. Gilded bronze wall brackets for hanging lamps and candles were attached to the walls, and mirrors in gilt frames placed over the fireplace mantels.

Jackson also purchased three cut-glass chandeliers to light the room. Each chandelier, which featured 18 whale oil lamps, hung from the ceiling medallions and were complemented with whale oil wall sconces and table lamps. There were also 20 spittoons. His expenditures totaled $9,358.27, provided by a friendly Congress eager to make the White House a more elegant symbol of the nation.

The East Room's original 18-lamp chandeliers were removed by Jackson in 1834 and placed in the State and Family Dining Rooms. Véron supplied the East Room with a more luxurious set.

Mid to late 19th century refurbishments

Furniture upholstered in light blue, light blue curtains, and imported French silver wallpaper with a gold border were added to the East Room by the Martin Van Buren administration in 1839. At some point prior to the inauguration of President William Henry Harrison in March 1841, the East Room acquired eight floor-to-ceiling mirrors with broad, heavily carved frames. President James K. Polk had the White House plumbed for gas heating and lighting in 1848. Cornelius & Company of Philadelphia retrofitted the 1834 chandeliers for gas, and Polk himself watched their first lighting. By the end of the Polk administration in January 1849, the East Room was adorned with three chandeliers, three "pier glasses" (mirrors), red damask window drapes, white muslin window curtains, four new sofas, 24 new chairs, three large tables (placed in the center of the room), four pier tables with marble tops, a large carpet, four new hearthrugs, four fire fenders, four large candelabra, eight small candelabra, eight mantle ornaments, and a bust of George Washington.

New draperies, lace curtains, and a carpet were added by Jane Pierce, wife of President Franklin Pierce, in 1853. The Pierces also had the over-mantel mirrors and pier mirrors reframed by L. R. Menger of New York.

1861 Lincoln refurbishment
Despite this redecoration, the East Room was nonetheless somewhat shabby by 1861. On April 18, 1861, about 60 militiamen from Kansas took up temporary residence in the East Room pending construction of barracks for them in the city. They did serious damage to the carpet, and sometimes shot bullets into the walls. Mary Todd Lincoln refurbished the room with damask drapes, lace curtains, wallpaper, and a new $2,500 carpet later that year. The wallpaper was heavy patterned velvet cloth paper from Paris in crimson, garnet, and gold, and supplied by William H. Carryl & Brother of New York. The floor covering was an Axminster carpet woven in Glasgow, Scotland. The largest loom in the world was needed to weave the carpet, which covered the entire floor. The drapes were crimson with heavy gold fringe and numerous gold tassels, while the lace curtains behind them were imported from Switzerland.

The East Room under the Lincolns remained sparsely furnished, however, as befit a reception hall. The three chandeliers, which dated from the Jackson administration, were cleaned and reinstalled. They were so brilliant that the press assumed they were new. Mrs. Lincoln left the three large mahogany tables with black and gold marble inlays, which had long occupied the room, below each chandelier.

Two funerals for Lincoln Family members were held in the East Room in the 1860s. The first was that of 11-year-old Willie Lincoln, President Abraham Lincoln's son, who died of typhoid fever on February 21, 1862. Just over three years later, Lincoln's body lay in state in the East Room as well, and his funeral was held there on April 19.

At the time of Lincoln's death in 1865, the East Room contained 24 chairs, four sofas, four tables, eight sets of drapes, eight sets of lace curtains, eight mirrors, and one carpet. All the furniture was in poor shape. During his administration, members of the public attending the weekly receptions in the room had heavily vandalized the room in seeking souvenirs, ripping down portions of the wallpaper and stealing cords and tassels from the drapes. Someone even cut a square yard from one of the damask drapes. Others took scissors and knives to the carpet, gouging the oak floor beneath, and gilded ornaments were stolen from the mantels.

President Andrew Johnson had the public rooms on the State Floor refurbished in 1866. His wife, Eliza McCardle Johnson, was in frail health and did little in the way of entertaining or overseeing the White House. Johnson instead relied on his daughter, Martha Patterson (wife of Senator David T. Patterson). In May, the East Room was cleared of furnishings. Mrs. Patterson oversaw the selection of new yellow wallpaper with a black and gold border, lace curtains, and reupholstered furniture. The ceiling was repainted and frescoes added, and the ceiling centerpieces and cornices were regilded. Only once did Mrs. Johnson intervene, and that was to request that the paint applied to ceiling be of the highest quality. Patterson also had the three large marble-topped tables removed from the East Room and placed in the family private quarters, and two of the four pier tables added to the Family Dining Room. The East Room was finished in early 1867.

1873 Grant refurbishment

The East Room was radically redecorated in 1873 during the administration of Ulysses S. Grant. Architects Orville Babcock (Commissioner of Public Buildings and Grounds), Richard Ezdorf, William J. McPherson, and Alfred Mullett were faced with both a decorative and structural task. The heavy walls above the East Room as well as inadequate structural support had caused the ceiling to sag appreciably. Furthermore, the Grants wanted to renovate the East Room into a far more modern space reflective of their Midwest tastes. The architects added new load-bearing beams across the ceiling, which made the room appear to be much lower in height. Corinthian columns were added to support these beams. To integrate the beams into the room, they extended the 1815 frieze decoratively across the beams. The ceiling, divided into three sections by the beams, was refrescoed as well. Elaborately carved new fireplaces painted in white and gold replaced the simpler 1829 fireplaces. To help integrate the load-bearing columns into the room, white and gold painted pilasters were added to the room. White-painted carved paneling with Greek Revival designs; massive, low-hanging, cut-glass chandeliers (replacing those which had hung since 1834); pearl gray and gilt wallpaper, and wall-to-wall carpeting in a floral pattern completed the redecoration. Much of the furniture in the room was sold at public auction (a common and unremarkable practice until the 20th century). The architects called the style "Pure Greek", and architectural historian Patrick Phillips-Schrock called it "sumptuous", but it was widely derided as "Steamboat Gothic". Nellie Grant's lavish wedding took place in the East Room on May 21, 1874.

Late 19th century changes
President Chester A. Arthur hired the Washington, D.C., firm of W. B. Moses & Son to redecorate much of the White House in 1881, including the East Room. Moses & Son added new window curtains and drapes, and a suite of ebony furniture carved in a Japanese style. This suite included sofas, arm chairs, side chairs, and corner chairs. Arthur then auctioned off an immense quantity of older White House furnishings in April 1882, including some amount of undescribed older furniture from the East Room. Desiring an even grander approach to the public rooms, Arthur hired Tiffany & Co. in 1882 to redecorate the East Room yet again. Most of this work involved painting and regilding, however. No new furniture was ordered, and the over-mantel and pier mirrors reframed or regilded.

President Grover Cleveland made no changes to the East Room, although a divan upholstered in gold was added below the main chandelier. It was supplied by W. H. Houghton & Co. of Washington, D.C.

Cleveland's successor, Benjamin Harrison, refurbished most of the State Floor rooms again in 1891 after the White House was wired for electricity. W. H. Post & Co. of Hartford, Connecticut, did the work. The ceiling was repainted, the wallpaper replaced, and new silk damask curtains installed. The furniture in the East Room was reupholstered as well in a gold brocatelle (a brocade with the design in high relief). A new Axminster carpet,  in size, was also laid down. When Caroline Harrison died on October 25, 1892 (two weeks before the presidential election), her funeral was held in the East Room.

Two Sèvres vases (on marble pedestals) were added to the East Room in 1897. They were a gift of the government of France to mark the laying of the Franco-American transatlantic telegraph cable that year.

1902 Roosevelt restoration

In 1902, President Theodore Roosevelt engaged the architectural firm of McKim, Meade & White to renovate and expand the White House.  Their intention was three-fold: To modernize the White House, to establish a decorating motif that would never have to be altered, and to recreate the White House's early American interiors. Although this last guideline was followed in most rooms, it was not in the East Room. McKim, Meade & White drew their inspiration for the East Room from British and French manor house interiors of the 1790s. Nonetheless, the Colonial Revival style was more of an idealized than historically accurate aesthetic, and McKim, Mead & White's interiors reflected a tendency toward light-filled spaces and away from patterns and "busy" or cluttered spaces.

As the East Room had not been decorated until 1829, the architects took some liberties, devising a room based on the 1780 Louis XVI style salon de famille in the Château de Compiègne. For the walls, the designers chose pilasters carved by Herter Brothers of New York City, which appeared to support Neoclassical entablatures. There were 12 faux entablatures, each made of marble and depicting scenes from Aesop's Fables. They were designed by Leon Marcotte of L. Marcotte & Co. of New York, and carved by the Piccirilli Brothers of New York City. The rest of the walls were painted cream white, and adorned with gilded sconces (supplied by the lighting firm of Edward F. Caldwell & Co.) and gold wall hangings. McKim, Meade & White strongly disliked the East Room's four fireplaces, which divided the area into three spaces. The mantels were replaced with  new ones in the Georgian style. The marble for each mantel came from a different state, and each was a different color.

Marcotte & Co. also designed, manufactured, and installed gilded ceiling decorations. The central section of the ceiling was decorated with a large plaster panel featuring an intricate medallion flanked by swags, acanthus, escutcheons, and scrollwork. A border of acanthus, scrollwork, and egg-and-dart moldings bordered the section. On the narrow ends of the room were smaller sections, similarly decorated.

Hanging from the ceiling were three large Bohemian crystal chandeliers. These replaced the larger, out-of-style chandeliers placed there in 1873 during the Grant administration. The tent-and-bowl chandeliers were also provided by Caldwell & Co. but manufactured by Christoph Palme & Co. of Parchen, Bohemia, Austria-Hungary. Their design was copied from 18th century English and French chandeliers. Caldwell & Co. also designed four gilded bronze floor lamps in the Louis XVI style, and four  floor candelabra in the Empire style with Egyptian Revival elements (such as winged lions).

The floor of the East Room was replaced with oak parquet, and trimmed in red Numidian marble from North Africa. (A box made from the old parquet floor was donated to the White House during the Jimmy Carter administration.)

In addition to the wall hangings, McKim, Meade & White commissioned a wide range of other furnishings more in line with their Louis XVI style salon de famille style. Marcotte and Co. supplied heavy velvet gold drapes, and topped each window with carved and gilded cornices of the company's own design. The existing pier tables were removed, and four richly carved and gilded Louis XVI Revival style console tables, also designed by Marcotte & Co., were placed between the pilasters. The existing seating was also removed, and Marcotte & Co. replaced it with 13 Louis XVI Revival gilded banquettes (upholstered benches). Marcotte & Co. also supplied new ornate gilded frames for each over-mantel mirror. A few items in the room were reused, however. These included the mantel candelabra, manufactured by Russell & LaFarge and purchased in the Monroe administration in 1817.

A personal inspection by Charles Follen McKim also found the East Room clearly sinking. The problem, not rectified until 1952, was that the interior walls rested on brick columns in the basement, which themselves were sitting on loose rubble footings atop soft soil. The columns were sinking into the soil under the mansion's weight. But forced by Roosevelt to finish the restoration as quickly as possible, McKim was unable to make any structural changes to solve the problem.

Post-1902 early 20th century changes
That same year, the Steinway & Sons piano company donated an ornate gilded grand piano to the White House. This piano (serial number 100,000) was placed in the East Room. During Roosevelt's term, the government of France donated Limoges porcelain busts of George Washington, Thomas Jefferson, Abraham Lincoln, and Benjamin Franklin to the White House. These were also placed in the East Room.

Slight changes were made to the East Room during the Woodrow Wilson administration. Ellen Axson Wilson, the president's first wife, made almost no changes to the room. She died in 1914, just two years into Wilson's first term. Wilson remarried a year later, and the new First Lady, Edith Bolling Galt Wilson, had the 1902 drapes replaced.

In the early 1930s, First Lady Lou Henry Hoover purchased a number of gilt upholstered dining room chairs in something approaching an Art Deco style for use in the East Room.

President Franklin D. Roosevelt did little to either renovate or maintain the White House during his unusually long tenure. Roosevelt believed that the White House should "do its part" during the Great Depression and World War II, and economize by minimizing expenditures. First Lady Eleanor Roosevelt had little interest in redecorating, and little in the way of social engagements occurred during the war. One of the few revisions came in the East Room, where the Vollmer suite of furniture was moved from the Blue Room. Steinway & Sons donated a second grand piano to the White House in 1938. Steinway historians Miles Chapin and Rodica Prato call it the "best-known art-case Steinway" in the world. The case is decorated with scenes depicting American music and dance, each gilded in gold leaf. The tableaux, designed by artist Dunbar Beck, depict people dancing the Virginia reel, chanting by Native Americans, cowboys singing during a cattle drive, a barn dance, and African American slaves singing in the fields. The legs of the piano feature gilded eagles, designed and carved by Albert Stewart. (Steinway & Sons completely refurbished the piano in 1992.) Eleanor Roosevelt also changed the draperies in the East Room from gold to crimson.

1952 Truman restoration

By the late 1940s, the East Room—along with the rest of the White House—was in such poor shape that its structural integrity was at risk. President Harry S. Truman was attending a concert in the East Room on February 11, 1947, when he was informed that the ceiling of the room was being pulled down by the weight of the chandeliers. The following day, the chandeliers were taken down. On October 26, 1948, plaster fell from the ceiling of the East Room, exposing a  crack in the ceiling. The East Room was cleared of all furniture, and floor-to-ceiling X-shaped wooden braces erected in the room to stabilize it. The room was then sealed off. Engineers with the Public Building Administration and White House staff feared the entire building could collapse. President and Mrs. Truman left the White House on September 27, 1948, for a 45-day nationwide political barnstorming tour. When they returned to the White House on November 5, they were immediately informed that the White House had to be evacuated. The White House was closed to the public on November 7, and after a two-week vacation in Key West, Florida, the Trumans moved into Blair House on November 21, 1948.

During the Truman White House reconstruction that began in 1949, the East Room was found to be in very poor condition. Previous renovations had seriously damaged the interior walls. In one  section of wall, no fewer than five doors had been cut through the masonry, severely weakening it. Paneling, windows, and furnishings were dismantled, numbered, and stored. Although great care was taken in removing the plasterwork, there was no way to avoid cracking it during removal. Molds were made from the originals, and new plasterwork installed. Even so, architect Lorenzo Winslow simplified many of the designs before they were cast, allegedly to make them look less Renaissance Revival and more "American". Less care was taken in removing the woodwork, some of which was damaged when pried loose. Other pieces were too brittle to be reused, and what could be reused had to be restored (often by removing many layers of paint). But by late 1951, with the White House renovation months behind, costs soaring, and President Truman demanding that the work be sped up, workers found it easier to machine new pieces than restore old wood. All of the paneling for the East Room was condemned as unfit for reuse, whether it was actually unusable or not, and replaced with new wood. (Although some of the East Room woodwork would be chopped up for souvenirs, most of it was used as landfill at Fort Myer in Arlington County, Virginia.) The new panelling was also simpler and had considerably less presence, and was covered in a somewhat lighter color than the 1902 paint. A simpler crown molding and ceiling medallions were also installed.

The Herter pilasters and Piccirilli marble panels were either lost or too damaged to be reused during removal, and their fate remains unclear. To cut costs, the replacement entablature was made of a composite glue and sawdust mixture pressed into forms rather than carved from wood. While the feeling was similar, the robust architectural effect was diminished. Red marble mantels were installed, and the remaining Venetian window in the room was narrowed to help create the "American" feel. (The 1902 mantels were given away.)

The East Room's chandeliers were rewired and cleaned. They were also outfitted with softer internal illumination, and the chains holding the chandeliers shortened. The East Room also had a new parquet floor in a style taken from a design at the Palace of Fontainebleau, and silk curtains over the windows.

The Truman administration did not seek, nor did it receive, many donations of furniture for the White House during the 1952 renovation. But two items were received which made it into the East Room. These were mid-17th century Adam cambelback sofas, which were placed beneath the George and Martha Washington paintings.

Post-1952 refurbishments

Kennedy refurbishment

Jacqueline Kennedy made extensive renovations to the White House in 1961 and 1962. Her renovation was overseen by American antiques autodidact Henry Francis du Pont and French interior designer Stéphane Boudin and his company, Maison Jansen. Although many rooms were extensively altered by du Pont and Boudin, the Kennedy restoration made almost no changes to the East Room.

The biggest change to the room was in the window treatments. Jacqueline Kennedy specifically asked for new curtains for the East Room consisting of opaque silk undercurtains and yellow drapes. Boudin oversaw the design of new draperies, with silk provided by Maison Jansen. A draft design of the drapes and valances was not ready until mid-1963. Boudin, apparently wishing to draw attention to the center window between the fireplaces, designed a valance for the center window while putting all other drapes behind window boxes. For the drapes, Boudin suggested a braid border and tie-backs made of ball fringe covered in satin. Kennedy disapproved of Boudin's proposal for the valance and window boxes, as it did not make use of the historic 1902 gilt window cornices. She did, however, approve of the fabric and tie-backs. Made of a custom-manufactured gold and cream silk lampas, the fabric contained a non-repetitive design of birds, butterflies, cupids, flowers, medallions, roosters, and wheat and featured heavy fringe at the bottom. The drapes were hung in straight panels from the carved and gilded 1902 wooden cornices. The design of the valances was not finalized until April 1964. First Lady Lady Bird Johnson asked Jacqueline Kennedy to assist her in finalizing the design. Originally, they were to be of brocatelle, a jacquard weave fabric similar to brocade but thicker and heavier and with designs in high relief. But this design was countermanded by Boudin. Instead, gold lampas, trimmed with braid and hemmed with gilt, spun-metal twisted fringe at the bottom, was installed in flat panels from behind each cornice. The curtains and valances took nearly three years to design and manufacture, and were not hung in the room until the Johnson administration in 1965. The drapes and valances cost $26,149. The cost was covered by sales of Jacqueline Kennedy's guidebook to the White House, which by 1965 was in its fourth edition.

Another major change involved the fireplace mantels, which were painted at Boudin's request to appear like white marble, unifying the look of the room.

The Kennedy administration was the first to permit smoking in rooms on the State floor. To accommodate smoking, Jacqueline Kennedy wanted portable ashtrays for the East Room. She initially considered modified versions of ashtrays seen at the home of her friend, Bunny Mellon, but rejected this idea in favor of a unique design. Maison Jansen designed stands which featured brass legs shaped like bamboo, brass handles, and Carrara glass tops. The ashtrays cost $280, were manufactured in Maison Jansen's New York City office, and delivered in January 1963. Finding the cost too high (and without any economy of scale cost-savings), Kennedy then designed her own portable standing ashtrays. Twenty were eventually manufactured out of dark wood by White House carpenters, although the gray granite tops for the Kennedy-designed ashtrays were made by Jansen at a cost of $310.

Much of the furniture in the East Room was removed by Boudin to make the room appear to be of a single historic era. The 1902 console tables were removed from the piers between the windows, and the 1902 Louis XVI style floor lamps moved out of the corners and in front of the piers. The 1952 Adam-style camelback sofas were removed at the instigation of du Pont, and replaced with gilt benches. Research conducted by White House Curator Lorraine Waxman Pearce and Jacqueline Kennedy identified the four Monroe-era candelabra (which had been moved), and restored them to the mantels in the room's southern wall. Early 19th-century crystal candelabra (of an indeterminate manufacture) were placed on the mantels on the room's northern wall. To complement the paintings of George and Martha Washington, Jacqueline Kennedy was loaned portraits of a young Bushrod Washington (George Washington's nephew and an Associate Supreme Court Justice) and his wife, Julia Ann Blackburn Washington. These portraits by Chester Harding were hung on the east wall. Kennedy's friend, Jayne Wrightsman, donated two early 19th-century wall sconces, which were wired for electricity by White House staff and hung on either side of the center window.

Jacqueline Kennedy also conceived the idea of constructing a portable stage for use in the East Room.  Designed by ballet impresario Lincoln Kirstein and constructed by White House carpenters, the stage was clad in red velvet, small, and easily portable. It was stored off-site in a government warehouse, and took three men eight hours to retrieve, set up, clean, and prepare for performances.

The Kennedys often provided entertainment in the East Room after formal dinners, which necessitated finding seating for these events. The Hoover Art Deco dining room chairs (which by 1961 had been moved to the White House theater) were used for this purpose. Additional seating was provided by cushioned bentwood chairs with canework backs (which had long been owned by the White House but whose provenance was unclear).

Johnson and Carter administration alterations
While the Kennedy stage was fine for the small, intimate performances in the East Room which the Kennedys favored, the President Lyndon B. Johnson and First Lady Lady Bird Johnson favored larger, more elaborate performances. Ballet patron Rebekah Harkness learned of the Johnsons' desire for a larger stage, and contacted noted ballet and theatrical designer Jo Mielziner to design something. Mielziner crafted a stage which took up a full third of the East Room, and featured cream white-painted pilasters matching the room's architecture. Mileziner originally wanted the stage's curtains to have the same fabric used for the East Room drapes. But when he learned of the cost, he settled for American-made gold silk curtains instead. The larger stage took eight men three days to set up.

In 1964, President Johnson issued an executive order creating a new Committee for the Preservation of the White House.  This body was tasked with advising the President and First Lady on the decor, preservation, and conservation of the East Room and other public rooms at the White House. The committee has met continuously since then, except for the period 1981 to 1988.

In 1967, the government of Italy donated a late 18th-century carved wood and terra cotta nativity scene to the White House.  This 30-piece creche, manufactured in Naples and with the figures clad in original hand-sewn fabrics, was placed on view in the East Room during the Christmas season, and it has been erected there every holiday season since. Ten additional antique Italian nativity figures were donated to the East Room creche set during the Carter administration.

The East Room flooring was replaced in 1978 during the Carter administration. Years of wear and tear had nearly worn through the parquet.

Reagan, Clinton, and Bush refurbishments
In 1981, the Reagan administration undertook a private fund-raising campaign to extensively renovate the White House. Hoping to raise $200,000, the project raised $822,641, and Nancy Reagan oversaw a $730,000 project which largely renovated the private living quarters and restored hundreds of antique furniture items throughout the Executive Mansion. The floors, paneling, and plasterwork in the room all were assessed and underwent conservation to ensure their longevity. Mrs. Reagan made only minor improvements to the East Room, however. These included repainting the room (it retained its warm cream color), and adding gold silk swag valances over the draperies. Over-draperies, ordered in the Carter administration, were also replaced in the East Room during the Reagan administration, at a cost of $130,000.

During the Clinton administration, the faux white marble finish painted on the mantels and baseboards in the 1960s was removed to reveal the original "rouge antique" (reddish) marble from Vermont installed during the White House's renovation in 1951. Although the East Room's oak floors had been bare since 1903, three matching $259,330 wool carpets were installed in February 1995. These carpets, ordered in 1990, were designed to reflect the plaster ceiling moldings created during the John Quincy Adams administration in the late 1820s. Woven by Edward Fields Inc. of New York and paid for with private donations raised by the White House Endowment Fund, the carpets were designed to cover most of the floor to protect it from dirt and the occasional pebble stuck in the tread of a shoe.

Minor refurbishment was made to the East Room in September 2003 during the administration of George W. Bush. The Committee for the Preservation of the White House had become dissatisifed with the golden silk swag valances installed during the Reagan presidency. The Kennedy-era Empire-style gold draperies were replaced with nearly identical ones, but the swags were made  deeper to make them appear more substantial. The room was repainted in the same warm cream color it had for the last century. The refurbishment cost $200,000, and was paid for by private donations to the White House Endowment Fund.

Notable events in the East Room
The East Room is used for a wide range of events, which include the swearing-in of Cabinet members and justices of the Supreme Court, press conferences, the signing of legislation, receptions for foreign dignitaries.

Presidential funerals and lying in repose

Eight presidents have died in office.  All but one (James A. Garfield) lay in repose or had a funeral in the East Room. Presidential funerary events held in the East Room comprise:

 William Henry Harrison – Harrison's body lay in repose for just under three days in the East Room. An Episcopal funeral service was read over Harrison's body on April 7, 1841.
 Zachary Taylor – Taylor's body lay in repose for slightly more than three days in the East Room. An Episcopal funeral service was read over Taylor's body on July 13, 1850.
Abraham Lincoln – Lincoln's body lay in repose for four days in the East Room. A Presbyterian funeral service was read over Lincoln's body on April 19, 1865.
 William McKinley – McKinley's body arrived in the East Room about 9:00 p.m. on September 16, 1901. He lay in repose until about 8:00 a.m. on September 17, when his remains were removed to the United States Capitol rotunda for a funeral.
 Warren G. Harding – Harding's body lay in repose in the East Room beginning about 11:00 p.m. on August 7, 1923. At 10:00 a.m. on August 8, his remains were removed to the Capitol rotunda for a funeral.
 Franklin D. Roosevelt – Roosevelt's body lay in repose in the East Room beginning about 11:00 a.m. on April 14, 1945. An Episcopal funeral service was read over his body at 4:00 p.m. that same day.  The service lasted 25 minutes, and Roosevelt lay in repose from 4:30 p.m. until about 9:00 p.m., when his casket was removed to Union Station for the train ride to Hyde Park, New York.
 John F. Kennedy – Kennedy's body lay in repose in the East Room beginning about 4:40 a.m. on November 23, 1963. A blessing was said by a Roman Catholic priest at 5:00 a.m. on November 23, but the Mass at 10:00 a.m. was held in the State Dining Room rather than East Room. A second Mass (not a funeral Mass), for Kennedy family members and close friends, occurred in the East Room at 11:15 a.m. on November 24. Kennedy's casket was removed from the East Room at about 1:00 p.m.

First Family funerals
In addition to Presidents, several members of First Families have died while living in the White House.  Funerals held in the East Room for family members include:

 Letitia Tyler – An Episcopal funeral service for her was held in the East Room on September 12, 1842.
 Willie Lincoln – Lincoln's body lay in repose in the Green Room of the White House until his burial. A Presbyterian funeral service for him was held in the East Room on February 21, 1862. (Pointedly, his family asked that his casket not be moved to the East Room for the service.)
 Caroline Harrison – A Presbyterian funeral service for her was held in the East Room on October 27, 1892.
 Ellen Axson Wilson – A Presbyterian funeral service for her was held in the East Room on August 10, 1914.
 Calvin Coolidge Jr. – A Congregationalist funeral service for him was held in the East Room on July 9, 1924.
 Robert Trump - A funeral service was held for him in the East Room on August 21, 2020.

Weddings

As of 2007, the White House had seen 17 weddings. Seven have occurred in the Blue Room, seven in the East Room, two in the Rose Garden, and one in the Yellow Oval Room. The East Room weddings include:

 Mary A. Eastin, niece of First Lady Rachel Jackson, to Lucius J. Polk, a Tennessee cotton planter and state legislator, on April 10, 1832.
 Mary Anne Lewis, daughter of one of President Jackson's U.S. Army friends, married Alphonse Pageot, chargé d'affaires at the Embassy of France, on November 29, 1832.
 Elizabeth Tyler, daughter of President John Tyler, married William Waller, Virginia businessman, on January 31, 1842.
 Nellie Grant, daughter of President Grant, married Algernon Sartoris, wealthy English singer and son of Adelaide Kemble, on May 21, 1874.
 Alice Roosevelt, daughter of President Theodore Roosevelt, married Representative Nicholas Longworth, on February 17, 1906.
 Jessie Wilson, daughter of President Wilson, married diplomat Francis Bowes Sayre Sr. on November 25, 1913.
 Lynda Bird Johnson, daughter of President Lyndon B. Johnson married Chuck Robb, a captain in the United States Marine Corps and future Senator from Virginia, on December 9, 1967.

Other important East Room events

East Room has served as the site of many important ceremonies, legislation and treaty signings, and other events. Some of these are:

 1860 – 15th President James Buchanan received the first diplomatic mission from Japan in the East Room on May 18.
 1861 – The funeral of Colonel Elmer E. Ellsworth, the first Union Army soldier to die in the American Civil War, was held in the East Room on May 25. Ellsworth, commander of the 11th New York Infantry ("Fire Zouaves"), had become a close friend of Lincoln's, who wept when he learned of Ellsworth's death.
 1890 – The funerals of Mrs. Delinda Catlin Tracy, 57 and Miss Mary Farrington Tracy, 35, were held in the East Room on February 3. They were the wife and daughter of Secretary of the Navy Benjamin F. Tracy, and died in a fire at their home two blocks from the White House on February 3. Tracy himself would have died of smoke inhalation trying to rescue them had not President Benjamin Harrison rushed to the scene and revived him.
 1929 – President Calvin Coolidge signed the Kellogg–Briand Pact in the East Room on January 17. President Herbert Hoover then met with representatives of the governments that ratified the Kellogg-Briand Pact in the East Room on July 24.
 1936 – President Franklin D. Roosevelt presided over a state funeral in the East Room for his long-time advisor Louis Howe on April 21.
 1943 – The agreement establishing the United Nations Relief and Rehabilitation Administration was signed in the East Room by representatives from 44 nations on November 9.
 1957 – President Dwight D. Eisenhower took the presidential oath of office in the East Room on January 20. The Constitution of the United States requires the oath to be administered at noon on January 20. But since this was a Sunday, Eisenhower took the oath in private at the required time. A public inauguration was held the following day.
 1964 – President Lyndon B. Johnson signed the Civil Rights Act of 1964 in the East Room on July 2. The ceremony was nationally televised, and more than 100 Senators and civil rights leaders attended the event.
 1973 – President Richard Nixon and Leonid Brezhnev, leader of the Soviet Union, signed the Scientific and Technical Cooperation Agreement in the Field of Peaceful Uses of Atomic Energy between the U.S. and the U.S.S.R. in the East Room on June 21.
 1974 – President Nixon gave a farewell address to the White House staff in the East Room at 9:00 a.m. on August 9. His resignation as President of the United States became effective at 11:35 a.m. when it was received by Secretary of State Henry Kissinger. Vice President Gerald Ford took the presidential oath of office in the East Room at 12:03 p.m. the same day.
 1976 – President Ford signed the Peaceful Nuclear Explosions Treaty in the East Room on May 28 while, simultaneously, Soviet leader Leonid Brezhnev signed the treaty in Moscow.
 1978 – President Carter, Egyptian President Anwar Sadat, and Israeli Prime Minister Menachem Begin signed the Camp David Accords in the East Room on September 17 at 11:00 p.m.
 1987 – President Ronald Reagan and Soviet leader Mikhail Gorbachev signed the Intermediate-Range Nuclear Forces Treaty (INF Treaty) in the East Room on December 8.
 1990 – President George H. W. Bush and Soviet President Gorbachev signed five treaties in the East Room on June 2: the 1990 Chemical Weapons Accord, the USSR–USA Maritime Boundary Agreement, new protocols governing the 1974 Threshold Test Ban Treaty and Peaceful Nuclear Explosions Treaty, and the Agreement on Trade Relations Between the United States of America and the Union of Soviet Socialist Republics (which provided for reciprocal Most Favored Nation status for the Soviet Union, improved market access in the Soviet Union for U.S. goods and services, freer operation of U.S. commercial representations in the USSR, and stronger intellectual property rights protection).
 2011 – President Barack Obama announced the death of Osama bin Laden in the East Room on May 2.

In popular culture
The East Room has appeared in a number of motion pictures about the president of the United States. It is one of the most commonly depicted spaces in the White House, along with the Entrance Hall, Cross Hall, and West Sitting Hall. Accuracy in its depiction has generally been good. One outstanding example is the 1944 biographical picture Wilson, which was extremely accurate (even down to the style of paneling). The film's art director Wiard Ihnen and set decorator Thomas Little won an Academy Award for their work on the film.  Many recent films have used Zuber wallpaper to depict the East Room—the same wallpaper purchased by Jacqueline Kennedy during the East Room's 1963 redecoration. President Bill Clinton gave the producers of the 1995 film The American President extensive access to the White House, which allowed them to create a superb replica of the East Room as well. Far less successful was the 2005 television series Commander in Chief, which depicted the East Room as a kind of shabby hotel lobby.

A life-size copy of the East Room was built at the Richard Nixon Presidential Library and Museum. It is only a casual copy, and not completely accurate in its details.

The East Room made the news on September 29, 2014, after The Washington Post revealed that Omar J. Gonzalez had run through the room during his September 19, 2014, intrusion at the White House. Initially, the United States Secret Service reported that Gonzalez, who jumped the fence at the North Lawn and raced to the mansion, had only gotten a few steps into the Entrance Hall. But the Post revealed that the knife-wielding Gonzalez knocked down a Secret Service agent, ran into the Cross Hall, and ran through the East Room before being tackled by a counter-assault agent at the door leading to the Green Room.

References

Notes

Citations

Bibliography

Further reading
 Abbott, James A. A Frenchman in Camelot: The Decoration of the Kennedy White House by Stéphane Boudin. Boscobel Restoration Inc.: 1995. .
 Clinton, Hillary Rodham. An Invitation to the White House: At Home with History. Simon & Schuster: 2000. .
 Seale, William. The President's House. White House Historical Association and the National Geographic Society: 1986. .
 Seale, William, The White House: The History of an American Idea. White House Historical Association: 1992, 2001. .
 The White House: An Historic Guide. White House Historical Association and the National Geographic Society: 2001. .

External links

 White House Museum: East Room floor plan and historical photographs

Articles containing video clips
Rooms in the White House